Vladimir Curbet (5 December 1930 – 8 December 2017) was a Moldovan choreographer. From 1957 until his death in late 2017 he was the 13th director of the Moldovan national folk dance ensemble Joc.

Curbet died on 8 December 2017, 3 days after his 87th birthday. He was buried on 13 December 2017 in the Chișinău Central Cemetery.

Awards and recognition
People's Artist of the Moldavian SSR (1967)
USSR State Prize (1972)
Order of Friendship of Peoples (1980)
People's Artist of the USSR (1981)
Order of the Red Banner of Labour (twice)
Order of the Republic (Moldova) (1992)
 Moldova State Prize (2012)
 Order of the Bogdan The Founder
 Honorary citizen of Chișinău (2014)

References

1930 births
2017 deaths
People from Orhei District
Communist Party of the Soviet Union members
People's Artists of Moldova
People's Artists of the USSR
Recipients of the Order of Friendship of Peoples
Recipients of the Order of the Red Banner of Labour
Recipients of the Order of the Republic (Moldova)
Recipients of the USSR State Prize
Moldovan choreographers
Moldovan ethnographers
Moldovan folklorists
Soviet choreographers
Soviet ethnographers
Soviet folklorists